Haywood Academy is a secondary school with academy status for 11- to 19-year-olds located on High Lane in the Stoke On Trent town of Burslem, England. The Sixth Form is located in the Old Town Hall in Burslem, 1 mile from the main site. It was formerly known as Haywood Engineering College, and changed its name in July 2013 to reflect its Academy status.  Haywood Academy is a member of the Schools Cooperative Society and is a cooperative school, governed by local people for the benefit of local young people. Its innovative sixth form provision  has been highly regarded by the DFE as best practice.

History
It was formerly known as Stanfield Technical High School, then as Haywood High School, followed by Haywood Engineering College and currently Haywood Academy.

References

External links
 
 History of former school

Secondary schools in Stoke-on-Trent
Academies in Stoke-on-Trent